The Wittockiana is a public museum and library located in Brussels (Belgium) devoted to the arts of the book and of bookbinding.

The museum is based on the personal collection of Michel Wittock, a former entrepreneur and bibliophile, who donated his collection to the King Baudouin Fondation on 2010. The library was opened to the public in 1983. The Wittockiana is supported by the Fédération Wallonie-Bruxelles .

The museum reflects Wittock's interests and focuses on books and bookbindings dating back to the Renaissance to our time. Among others it holds an almost complete collection of the Almanach de Gotha, a collection of appr. 600 precious rattles (the former collection of Idès Cammaert), the archives of Valere Gille, a writer and influent personality in the literary world of the first half of the 20th century (whose office furniture is designed by Paul Hankar)  and a part of the personal archive of Lucien Bonaparte.

The museum also hosts temporary exhibitions.

See also
List of museums in Brussels
Royal Library of Belgium
List of libraries in Belgium

References

External links
Official website

Museums in Brussels
Woluwe-Saint-Pierre
Bookbinding
1983 establishments in Belgium
Libraries in Belgium
Libraries established in 1983